Forest Hill was a small settlement in Center Township, Russell County, Kansas, United States.

History
Forest Hill was issued a post office in 1878. The post office was discontinued in 1895.

References

Former populated places in Russell County, Kansas
Former populated places in Kansas